Mi corazón es tuyo (English title: My Heart is Yours) is a Mexican telenovela produced by Juan Osorio for Televisa. The telenovela is an adaptation of the Spanish TV series Ana y los 7. It was adapted in Mexico by Alejandro Pohlenz, Marcia del Río, and Pablo Ferrer.

Silvia Navarro and Jorge Salinas are the protagonists, while Mayrín Villanueva stars as the main antagonist and Fabiola Campomanes is the co-protagonist.

Production of Mi corazón es tuyo officially started on April 21, 2014.

Plot
Fernando Lascurain is a wealthy businessman and recent widower, attempting to raise his seven unruly children: Estefania "Fanny", Fernando "Nando", Alicia, Sebastian, Alex, Guille and Luz. He seeks the assistance of a new nanny, despite his children having driven away all the previous ones. He hires and falls in love with Ana Leal, a struggling exotic dancer who tries to hide her double life. Although Ana lacks experience and a refined education, she quickly bonds with the Lascurain children. Ana dreams of being a mother and also to find her lost-long mother, who left her in an orphanage at the age of three with only her beloved guitar, but when her home is destroyed following an accident, she must borrow money from her ruthless boss at "Chicago", the night club where she is secretly employed. When Fernando simultaneously falls for Ana and Isabela, an economist and sophisticated woman who is trained by her mother to marry a millionaire, he must choose between both women.

Just when Fernando realizes he's in love with Ana, he decides to marry Isabela instead, who is pregnant and he believes that the baby is his, when the father is actually Enrique, a fellow employee from their company and Isabela's ex-lover who secretly hates Fernando.

Fernando and Isabela marry, much to his children's dismay and Ana's heartbreak, and she later finds solace with Diego, Fernando's brother. Time pass and Isabela and Fernando's marriage fails because he still has feelings for Ana, and also because Isabela mistreats Fernando's children and Ana, and he sees her true colors and divorces her.

Soon, after many efforts, he manages to reconcile with Ana and proposes to her and she accepts, but Isabela sets him up to discover Ana's double life in the Chicago club and feeling deceived, he angrily calls off their engagement.

However, after almost losing Ana to a vengeful and insane Enrique (who dies before he could reveal to Fernando that he was the real father of Isabela's son, Diego Nicolas), Fernado forgives her and despite Isabela's efforts to sabotage them, they get married and Ana gives birth to twin girls and live happily with their ten children, while Isabela ends up morbidly obese, poor and alone.

Production 

The telenovela is an adaptation of the original Spanish television series, "Ana y los 7". Based on the original script by Ana Obregón, who wrote and starred in the original series, the remake was adapted by writers Alejandro Pohlenz, Marcia del Río, and Pablo Ferrer.
Juan Osorio serves as executive producer. The production of the telenovela officially started on April 21, 2014, at a shopping mall in Metepec, Mexico, outside of Mexico City. Although the majority of filming is conducted on soundstages at Televisa San Ángel in Mexico City, additional scenes are also filmed throughout the state of Mexico, where its governor, Eruviel Ávila Villegas, met with the cast during one day of filming. Some of the cast filmed scenes in Puerto Vallarta and a resort in Riviera Nayarit in late January 2015.

Filming concluded in late February 2015. A free concert, serving as the telenovela's final episode, was filmed at La Bombonera stadium in Toluca, Mexico on February 21, 2015. The concert featured performances from Banda El Recodo, Daniela Romo, Axel, Kaay, Paulina Goto, Pablo Montero, and other special guests. The telenovela's finale is scheduled to air on March 1, 2015 in Mexico and March 27, 2015 in the US. Following the airing of the final episode on television, ten more additional episodes and three alternative endings will be available to stream on the telenovela's official episode, MiCorazonesTuyo.com.

Promotion
To promote the telenovela, a special viewing party, which included the presentation of the cast, crew, and a trailer of new scenes, was held for the media on June 24, 2014, at Televisa San Ángel. The event was also streamed exclusively online for fans on Televisa's official website of the telenovela.

Casting 
Many of the cast members, including Carmen Salinas, Juan Pablo Gil, Paulina Goto, and Rene Casados, auditioned for the program at the Televisa San Ángel studio in Mexico City on February 13, 2014. Their casting in the telenovela was officially confirmed later that same month.

Theatre production
On February 6, 2015, producers revealed that a stage version of the telenovela had been commissioned due its popularity in Mexico. The cast rehearsed for the play while simultaneously filming final episodes for the telenovela. The play, based on a family friendly version of the show, will include all of the Lascuráin family members and special musical performances from the cast. Productions will be held throughout Mexico. The play debuted on March 6, 2015 in Puebla, Mexico. Additional performances are scheduled for venues in Guadalajara, Monterrey, Tampico, León, Mexico City, and other Mexican cities during March and April 2015.

Notes

Cast

Mexico broadcast

Following its premiere on June 30, 2014, the program earned a 22.8 in ratings for its 8 p.m. time slot. It was the second highest rated telenovela of the evening on Canal de las Estrellas, following the telenovela, Lo que la vida me robó.

On June 30, 2014, Canal de las Estrellas began broadcasting Mi corazón es tuyo weeknights at 8:25pm, replacing Qué pobres tan ricos. The last episode was broadcast on March 1, 2015, with Amores con trampa replacing it the following day.

United States broadcast
During its premiere week from July 21 to July 25 on Univision, the telenovela was watched by 8.4 million viewers, earning Univision the #1 spot a broadcast network for viewers aged 18 to 34 in the 8 p.m.time slot.

Univision began broadcasting Mi corazón es tuyo on July 21, 2014, weeknights at 8pm/7c, replacing one hour of De que te quiero, te quiero. The last episode was broadcast on March 27, 2015, with Amores con trampa replacing it on March 30, 2015.

Soundtrack 
Some songs from the telenovela are composed by Jorge Eduardo Murguía and Mauricio Arriaga. The song "Te tengo y no" was written by America Sierra and performed by Pablo Montero. "Maquina del tiempo" is a song performed by Abraham Batarse who also acts in the telenovela.

Awards and nominations

See also

References

External links 
 

Mexican telenovelas
2014 telenovelas
Televisa telenovelas
2014 Mexican television series debuts
Spanish-language telenovelas
2015 Mexican television series endings
Comedy telenovelas
Mexican television series based on Spanish television series
Television shows set in Mexico